Trail of Kit Carson is a 1945 American Western film directed by Lesley Selander, written by Jack Natteford and Albert DeMond, and starring Allan Lane, Helen Talbot, Tom London, Twinkle Watts, Roy Barcroft and Kenne Duncan. It was released on July 11, 1945, by Republic Pictures.

Plot

Cast  
Allan Lane as Bill Harmon
Helen Talbot as Joan Benton
Tom London as John Benton
Twinkle Watts as Peggy Bailey
Roy Barcroft as Doc Ryan
Kenne Duncan as Trigger Chandler
Jack Kirk as Sheriff Bailey
Bud Geary as Henchman Red Snyder
Tom Dugan as Bartender Bart Hammond
George Chesebro as Kirby
Robert J. Wilke as Dave MacRoy 
Freddie Chapman as Freddie
Dickie Dillon as Dickie

References

External links 
 

1945 films
1940s English-language films
American Western (genre) films
1945 Western (genre) films
Republic Pictures films
Films directed by Lesley Selander
American black-and-white films
1940s American films